These are the official results of the Women's Individual Pursuit at the 2000 Summer Olympics in Sydney, Australia. The races were held on Sunday, 17 September, and Monday, 18 September 2000 at the Dunc Gray Velodromewith a race distance of 3 km.

Medalists

Records

Qualifying round
17 September

The twelve riders raced against each other in matches of two.  Qualification for the next round was not based on who won those matches, however.  The cyclists with the four fastest times advanced, regardless of whether they won or lost their match.

Semi-finals
Held 17 September

In the first round of actual match competition, cyclists were seeded into matches based on their times from the qualifying round.  The fastest cyclist faced the fourth-fastest and the second-fastest faced the third.  Winners advanced to the finals while losers met in the bronze-medal match.

Heat 1

Heat 2

Finals
Held 18 September
Gold Medal

Bronze Medal

References

External links
Official Olympic Report

W
Cycling at the Summer Olympics – Women's individual pursuit
Track cycling at the 2000 Summer Olympics
Olymp
Women's events at the 2000 Summer Olympics